The term perching ducks is used colloquially to mean any species of ducks distinguished by their readiness to perch high in trees

Until the late 20th century, perching ducks meant Cairinini, a tribe of ducks in the duck, goose and swan family Anatidae, grouped together on the basis of their readiness to perch high in trees. It has been subsequently shown that the grouping is paraphyletic and their apparent similarity results from convergent evolution, with the different members more closely related to various other ducks than to each other.

Perching duck species include: 

Plectropterinae
Spur-winged goose Plectropterus gambensis

Tadorninae
Salvadori's teal Salvadorina waigiuensis (initially placed in Anatinae)
Blue duck Hymenolaimus malacorhynchos
Torrent duck Merganetta armata

Anatinae
Brazilian teal Amazonetta brasiliensis

Species that were formally in the Cairdinini tribe,  and do not have an identified current subfamily include:

Comb duck Sarkidiornis melanotos: Tadorninae or basal Anatinae?
Pink-eared duck Malacorhynchus membranaceus: Tadorninae or Oxyurinae?
Hartlaub's duck Pteronetta hartlaubi: Anatinae or a very distinct clade?
Green pygmy goose Nettapus pulchellus: Anatinae or a Gondwanan clade?
Cotton pygmy goose Nettapus coromandellanus: Anatinae or a Gondwanan clade?
African pygmy goose Nettapusre auritus: Anatinae or a Gondwanan clade?
Muscovy duck Cairina moschata: Anatinae or Tadorninae?
White-winged duck Cairina scutulata: Anatinae or closer to Aythyinae?
Wood duck Aix sponsa:  Anatinae or Tadorninae?
Mandarin duck Aix galericulata:  Anatinae or Tadorninae?
Ringed teal Callonetta leucophrys:  Anatinae or Tadorninae?
Maned duck Chenonetta jubata:  Anatinae or Tadorninae?

References

Anatidae
Obsolete bird taxa
Bird common names